Most Southern Chinese weddings follow the main Chinese wedding traditions, although some rituals are unique to southern regions of China, particularly Guangdong, Guangxi, Macau, Hong Kong, Fujian, Taiwan and Hainan, and in Chinese communities in Southeast Asia.

Bride price 
The bride price is often subject to the groom's family economic status. Most brides' families try to avoid giving the impression of "selling the daughter" by not demanding a high bride price. In many southern wedding traditions, the bride price can be in the form of gold jewelry, fine fabric or just money.

Sometimes, a roast pig is given as part of the price for the bride. Traditionally, this symbolized that the bride was indeed a virgin, because "pig" and "virginity" are homophones in Cantonese.  In contemporary weddings, however, the baby roast pig is usually included as the first course at the wedding reception and part of the package provided by the caterer.

Exchange of gifts 
Monetary presents are usually offered in the form of a red envelope, or lai see (Jyutping: lei6 si6), to the new couple. The lai see symbolises luck and prosperity to the new family. It is also common to give gold jewelry as presents. Wedding presents to the couple are usually expected from the elders (Jyutping: zoeng2 bui3), family members who are older or of higher generation rank than the newlyweds.

Tea ceremony 
The elders sit while the couple serves tea to each one, beginning with the head of the family. The elder in return will offer a small present (usually lai see or gold jewellery) to the couple. This is repeated with the other elders in the order of descending generation rank.

The tea ceremony is also an opportunity for the bride and groom to express gratitude towards their parents for looking after them until the wedding day. In Chinese families, one is considered an adult and independent when one gets married. This also serves as the event during which the family meets the new spouse and welcomes him or her to the family.

See also 
 Chinese tea ceremony
 Chinese tea culture
 Chinese marriage

External links 
 Chinese Wedding Tradition and Customs

Cantonese culture
Culture in Guangdong
Culture in Guangxi
Culture in Fujian
Hokkien culture
Marriage in Chinese culture